Meiko Satomura (里村 明衣子, Satomura Meiko, born November 11, 1979) is a Japanese professional wrestler. She is currently signed to WWE performing on the NXT brand and the Japanese promotion Sendai Girls' Pro Wrestling. She is a one-time NXT UK Women's Champion.

Professional wrestling career

Gaea Japan (1995–2005) 
Satomura made her professional wrestling debut for all female promotion Gaea Japan on April 15, 1995, defeating Sonoko Kato.
On November 2, 1996, Meiko Satomura and Sonoko Kato defeated Sugar Sato and Chikayo Nagashima to become the inaugural AAAW Tag Team Champions. Satomura would go on to win that title on two more occasions, teaming with Ayako Hamada, and Chikayo Nagashima. She also won the AAAW Singles Championship twice, with her second reign ending at the hands of Aja Kong on April 3, 2005. Gaea Japan closed a week later on April 10 after staging its farewell show where Satomura defeated her trainer Chigusa Nagayo in the main event.

World Championship Wrestling (1996–1997) 
In 1996, Satomura started appearing for World Championship Wrestling (WCW) through Gaea Japan's working relationship with WCW which was attempting to establish a women's division. Satomura participated in an eight-woman tournament for the inaugural WCW Women's World Championship but was eliminated in the first round by eventual winner Akira Hokuto. When WCW introduced a second title for the women she entered into that tournament too, but was again knocked out in the first round by Toshie Uematsu who went on to win the tournament. Satomura continued to make appearances for WCW until the business relationship between the two promotions ended.

Sendai Girls' Pro Wrestling (2006–present) 
Following Gaea Japan's closure, Satomura formed the promotion Sendai Girls' Pro Wrestling with Jinsei Shinzaki.

On September 23, 2009, Satomura participated in the Splash J and Running G tournament along with Kaoru and Tomoko Kuzumi. In the Semi Final, Satomura's team defeated the Dynamite Kansai, Makie Numao and Yasuko Kuragaki to advance to the final. In the final, they defeated the team of Hikari Fukuoka, Kanako Motoya and Sonoko Kato to win the Splash J and Running G tournament.

Chikara (2012, 2016–2017) 
In May 2012, Satomura made her Chikara debut during the promotion's Aniversario weekend. That same year, Satomura returned to Chikara, participating in the group's premier tournament King of Trios. In 2016, Satomura along with Cassandra Miyagi and Dash Chisako won the King of Trios tournament. The trio was announced for the 2017 edition of the tournament.

WWE

Mae Young Classic (2018) 
On July 27, 2018, WWE announced that Satomura will be competing in the second Mae Young Classic tournament. She defeated Killer Kelly, Mercedes Martinez, and Lacey Lane before being defeated in the semifinals by Toni Storm.

NXT UK (2020–2022) 
On October 27, 2020, it was reported that Satomura had signed with WWE and would be an on-air talent and coach for NXT UK. On the January 28 episode of NXT UK, a video package aired hyping up Satomura's arrival to the brand.
On the February 11, 2021 episode of NXT UK, Satomura made her ring-debut, where she defeated Isla Dawn in a opening match. Soon after, Satomura began a feud with NXT UK Women's Champion Kay Lee Ray, unsuccessfully challenging for the title on the March 3 episode of NXT UK however won the title on the June 10 episode of NXT UK. Satomura became the first Japanese wrestler to hold the NXT UK Women's Championship, as well as in NXT UK overall. She had her first successful title defense against Amale on the July 15 episode of NXT UK. She would retain against Stevie Turner on the August 20 episode of NXT UK. She would then retain the championship against Blair Davenport on the January 6 episode of NXT UK and Isla Dawn on the March 24 episode.

NXT (2022–present) 
On the August 23, 2022, episode of NXT 2.0, Satomura made her first appearance on the American brand when she confronted the NXT Women's Champion Mandy Rose. The two agreed to a unification match for their titles on Worlds Collide, with Blair Davenport being added to the match. At the event, Rose won the match by pinning Davenport, thus ending Satomura's reign as NXT UK Women's Championship at 451 days (as recognized by WWE). On the February 14, 2023 episode of NXT, Satomura teamed with the NXT Women's Champion Roxanne Perez against Katana Chance and Kayden Carter in a winning effort. After the match, Satomura challenged Perez to an NXT Women's Championship match, which Roxanne accepted. The following week, the bout was made official for NXT Roadblock, where Satomura would lose via roll-up. Satomura then congratulated Perez after the match, only for Perez to collapse afterwards.

Other media 
Satomura appeared in the 2000 documentary Gaea Girls made for the BBC by Kim Longinotto and Jano Williams.

Championships and accomplishments 
 Chikara
 King of Trios (2016) – with Cassandra Miyagi and Dash Chisako
 DDT Pro-Wrestling
 KO-D Openweight Championship (1 time)
 KO-D 6-Man Tag Team Championship (1 time) – with Chihiro Hashimoto and Dash Chisako
 Fight Club: PRO
 FCP Championship (1 time)
 Gaea Japan
 AAAW Single Championship (2 times)
 AAAW Junior Heavyweight Tag Team Championship / AAAW Tag Team Championship (3 times) – with Sonoko Kato (1), Ayako Hamada (1) and Chikayo Nagashima (1)
 Hustling Cup (1996)
 High Spurt 600 (1998, 2001)
 Splash J and Running G (1995) – with Kaoru and Tomoko Kuzumi
Progress Wrestling
Progress World Women's Championship (1 time)
Pro Wrestling Illustrated
 Ranked No. 22 of the top 150 female wrestlers in the PWI Women's 150 in 2022
 Sendai Girls' Pro Wrestling
 Sendai Girls World Championship (1 time)
 Joshi Puroresu Dantai Taikou Flash Tournament (2011) – with Dash Chisako, Hiren, Kagetsu, Miyako Morino, Ryo Mizunami and Sendai Sachiko
 Tokyo Sports
 Joshi Puroresu Grand Prize (2013)
 Westside Xtreme Wrestling
 Femmes Fatale Tournament (2018)
 World Wonder Ring Stardom
 World of Stardom Championship (1 time)
 Stardom Year-End Award (1 time)
 Best Match Award (2015) vs. Io Shirai on December 23
WWE
NXT UK Women's Championship (1 time, final)

References

External links 

 
 
 
 
 

1979 births
20th-century professional wrestlers
21st-century professional wrestlers
Japanese female professional wrestlers
Expatriate professional wrestlers
Living people
Professional wrestling executives
Professional wrestling trainers
People from Niigata (city)
Sportspeople from Niigata Prefecture
NXT UK Women's Champions
World of Stardom Champions
KO-D 6-Man Tag Team Champions
KO-D Openweight Champions
AAAW Single Champions
AAAW Tag Team Champions
Progress Wrestling World Women's Champions